Waterhen 45 is a First Nations reserve in the Canadian province of Manitoba.

Geography 
Waterhen 45 is on the south shore of Waterhen Lake at the northern terminus of Provincial Road 276. The Waterhen River flows into Waterhen Lake near the southern boundary of Waterhen 45.

Demographics 

See also 
List of Indian reserves in Manitoba

References

West Region Tribal Council
Indian reserves in Northern Region, Manitoba